ISO 3166-2:CU is the entry for Cuba in ISO 3166-2, part of the ISO 3166 standard published by the International Organization for Standardization (ISO), which defines codes for the names of the principal subdivisions (e.g., provinces or states) of all countries coded in ISO 3166-1.

Currently for Cuba, ISO 3166-2 codes are defined for 15 provinces and 1 special municipality. The special municipality Isla de la Juventud is not part of any province and administered directly by the central government.

Each code consists of two parts, separated by a hyphen. The second part is two digits:
 01–16 except 02: provinces
 99: special municipality
The code  was assigned to La Habana Province, which was split into Artemisa and Mayabeque in 2011. The codes for the original 14 provinces were assigned roughly from west to east.

Current codes
Subdivision names are listed as in the ISO 3166-2 standard published by the ISO 3166 Maintenance Agency (ISO 3166/MA).

Click on the button in the header to sort each column.

Changes
The following changes to the entry are listed on ISO's online catalogue, the Online Browsing Platform:

See also
 Subdivisions of Cuba
 FIPS region codes of Cuba

External links
 ISO Online Browsing Platform: CU
 Provinces of Cuba, Statoids.com

2:CU
ISO 3166-2
Cuba geography-related lists